"Turn to You (Mother's Day Dedication)" is a song by Canadian singer Justin Bieber. It was released on May 11, 2012, two days before Mother's Day.

Background
The song was written and composed by Bieber, Nasri, Jacob Pena, Adam Messinger, and Tom Strahle. It was produced by Bieber alongside Adam Messinger for his third album, Believe, but was ultimately not included and instead released as a standalone single.

Chart performance

Release history

References

2012 singles
Justin Bieber songs
Songs written by Adam Messinger
Songs written by Nasri (musician)
Songs written by Justin Bieber
2012 songs
Island Records singles
Holiday songs